The 1964–65 Wisconsin Badgers men's basketball team represented University of Wisconsin–Madison. The head coach was John Erickson, coaching his sixth season with the Badgers. The team played their home games at the UW Fieldhouse in Madison, Wisconsin and was a member of the Big Ten Conference.

Schedule

|-
!colspan=12| Regular Season

References

External links
Wisconsin Badgers Basketball History 

Wisconsin Badgers men's basketball seasons
Wisconsin
Wisconsin Badgers men's basketball
Wisconsin Badgers men's basketball